Uterine hypoplasia, also known as naive uterus or infantile uterus, is a reproductive disorder characterized by hypoplasia of the uterus. It is usually due to pubertal failure/hypogonadism and may be treated with puberty induction using estrogens and/or progestogens.

See also
 Uterine hyperplasia
 Uterine malformation

References

Congenital malformations of uterus and cervix